"Into Each Life Some Rain Must Fall" is a 1944 song performed as a duet by The Ink Spots, featuring Bill Kenny, and Ella Fitzgerald. Their recording was made on August 30, 1944 for Decca Records (catalog No. 23356B). The song was written by Allan Roberts (lyrics) and Doris Fisher (melody). The name of the song originates from a quotation of Henry Wadsworth Longfellow from the poem "Rainy Day". The song has also been included in the soundtrack for several videogames.

Chart performance
The successful single went to number one on both The Harlem Hit Parade and the pop chart. The B-side of the single entitled, "I'm Making Believe" also became a popular hit on both charts.

Cover versions
 Teresa Brewer – her single for Coral Records charted briefly in 1953, peaking at No. 23.
 Frankie Avalon – included on the album The Young Frankie Avalon (1959).
 Kay Starr – Losers, Weepers (1960).
 Ella Fitzgerald – on the album Ella and Basie! (1963)
 Cliff Richard & The Shadows – on the soundtrack album for the 1965 film Finders Keepers. Released on Columbia Records (Columbia SCX 6079).
 Dianne Reeves included her version of the song for her Good Night, and Good Luck album (2005)
Smokey Robinson Warm Thoughts Album Released on Tamla Records (1980) "Into Each Rain Some Life Must Fall" (Doris Fisher, Allan Roberts) - 4:34

In pop culture
The song is included as part of the in-game radio station Diamond City Radio in the 2015 video game Fallout 4.
The song is included as part of the in-game radio station Galaxy News Radio's retro soundtrack in the 2008 video game Fallout 3.
The song can also be heard on the radio in the 2011 video game L.A. Noire.
It is played in the 2005 documentary Why We Fight.
"Into each life some rain must fall' is the opening line of the first verse to Deeper Shade of Blue by Steps.
The version by The Ink Spots and Ella Fitzgerald was used in the BBC series The Singing Detective (1986).
The song was used in the 2001 'Transport' commercial of Dutch insurance company Centraal Beheer.
The line: "Into each life a little rain must fall" is used in The Rockford Files, season 1 episode 7 at the 10 minute mark. Episode name: "Tall Woman in a Red Wagon".

References

1944 songs
1944 singles
The Ink Spots songs
Ella Fitzgerald songs
Teresa Brewer songs
Songs written by Doris Fisher (songwriter)
Songs written by Allan Roberts (songwriter)
Male–female vocal duets